Stonehenge is a rural locality on the Northern Tablelands of New England in New South Wales, Australia.

One of note is a roughly spherical monolith about 2.5 metres in diameter known as the Balancing Rock. The locality was named because of the local granite outcrops that were reminiscent of Stonehenge, England.

History
The land where Stonehenge Station was established is the territory of the Ngarabal people, who knew the area as "Hol'pin", meaning many casuarinas near a large plain.  The area contains sacred sites and remains of great significance to Ngarabal people today.

Stonehenge station was occupied by Thomas Hewitt in 1838 on behalf of Archibald Boyd making him the first settler in the Glen Innes district. In 1886 the station was purchased by a Queensland grazier, George Morris Simpson, who built the Stonehenge homestead the following year.

The Main North railway line (now closed) crosses the New England Highway at Stonehenge, which also had a railway station which opened in 1884 and was closed about 1974.

References

Towns in New South Wales